"I Couldn't Keep from Crying" is a song written and recorded by American country music artist Marty Robbins. Performers on the song include Slim Harbert on bass, Johnny Gimble on fiddle, Jimmy Rollins and Joe Knight on guitar, and Harold Carmack on piano.

Chart performance
The song reached number 5 on the US Billboard country chart in 1953.

Other versions
Johnny Cash released a version as part of an EP in 1960.  It is featured on his 1960 album, Now, There Was a Song!

References

1953 songs
1953 singles
Songs written by Marty Robbins
Marty Robbins songs
Johnny Cash songs
Columbia Records singles